is a 2012 

crossover anime film between Inazuma Eleven and Little Battlers Experience franchises produced by OLM, Inc., premiered in theaters on December 1, 2012.

Plot 
While playing a soccer match Inazuma Eleven are being attacked by an army of LBX when Danball Seki tried to stop the army of LBX. Now they have to work together as one team to protect the stadium and the people nearby. The trio Asta, San and Fran are the main antagonists, while Fran is supposedly their leader.

Characters
Inazuma Eleven GO
Tenma Matsukaze 
Kyousuke Tsurugi
Takuto Shindou
Ranmaru Kirino
Shinsuke Nishizono
Taiyou Amemiya
Hakuryuu
Hyouga Yukimura
Kinako Nanobana
Masaki Kariya
Ryouma Nishiki
Fei Rune

Adults
Mamoru Endou
Shuuya Gouenji
Shirou Fubuki
Ichirouta Kazemaru
Akio Fudou
Heigorou Kabeyama
Jirou Sakuma
Yuuto Kidou
Jousuke Tsunami
Ryuugo Someoka
Hiroto Kira
Full list: List of Inazuma Eleven GO characters

Danbōru Senki W
Ban Yamano
Hiro Oozora
Ran Hanasaki
Jin Kaidō
Kazuya Aoshima
Ami Kawamura
Yūya Haibara
Asuka Kojō
Jessica Kaios

References

External links
  
 

2012 anime films
Inazuma Eleven films
2010s Japanese-language films
Japanese crossover films
Japanese association football films
Association football in anime and manga
OLM, Inc. animated films
Animated sports films
2010s sports films